Manuel Antonio Capetillo Villaseñor (15 April 1926 – 5 May 2009) was a Mexican film actor, bullfighter, singer, and songwriter from Ixtlahuacán de los Membrillos, Jalisco.

On 5 May 2009, Capetillo died of respiratory insufficiency, in Chacala, Nayarit. The wake was held in Guadalajara, Jalisco, and his body also laid to rest in the capital. Although the media said that the cause of his death was intoxication and a problem with ulcers, the actor's son confirmed that a respiratory insufficiency was the cause of his death.

Selected filmography
El revólver sangriento (1964)
Alma llanera (1965)
El ojo de vidrio (1969)
El as de oros (1968)

References

External links

Mexican male film actors
Mexican male television actors
1926 births
2009 deaths
Male actors from Jalisco
Mexican people of Spanish descent